The Erie Reader is an Erie, Pennsylvania alternative newspaper which focuses on local news, culture and entertainment. It was founded on March 28, 2011 by Adam Welsh and Brian Graham.

The Erie Reader is a free publication and is distributed bi-weekly in most neighborhoods throughout the Erie region on Wednesdays, with approximately 15,000 copies distributed to over 300 high foot-traffic locations. It is Erie’s only independently run print newspaper.

The Erie Reader is known for several of its annual issues including Erie’s 40 Under 40, I2E (Otherwise known as the Industry, Innovation, and Entrepreneurship Issue) and their Best of Erie issue.

Awards and recognition
In 2014, the Erie Reader news staff received the Leadership Award from Erie Arts and Culture which "recognizes a business, government, or foundation that has exhibited long term support for arts and culture, OR whose work has had a significant impact on the region’s arts/cultural landscape OR has demonstrated a successful collaboration between an arts and cultural organization and business."

References

Mass media in Erie, Pennsylvania
Newspapers published in Pennsylvania
Alternative weekly newspapers published in the United States
2011 establishments in Pennsylvania
Publications established in 2011